Stefano Barba (born Rome, 10 January 1964) is a former Italian rugby union player and a current coach. He played as a centre.

Player career
Barba played for CUS Roma Rugby (1982/83), Petrarca Rugby (1983/84-1984/85), where he won 2 Italian Championships, CUS Roma Rugby (1985/86-1989/90), Amatori Rugby Milano (1990/91-1992/93), winning the Italian Championship for 2 titles, in 1990/91 and 1992/93, CUS Roma Rugby (1993/94), Rugby Roma Olimpic (1994/95) and S.S. Lazio Rugby 1927 (1997/98-1998/99). He left competition aged 35 years old.

International career
He had 35 caps for Italy, from 1985 to 1993, scoring 7 tries, 30 points on aggregate. He was called for the 1987 Rugby World Cup, playing in two games and remaining scoreless, and for the 1991 Rugby World Cup, playing once again in two games and scoring a try.

Coach career
After his retirement, he was the head coach of S.S. Lazio Rugby 1927, from 1998/99 to 2001/02. He also would be in charge of Italy U-17 national team, from 2003/04 to 2004/05.

References

External links 
 Stefano Barba International Statistics

1964 births
Italian rugby union players
Italy international rugby union players
Italian rugby union coaches
Rugby union centres
Amatori Rugby Milano players
Rugby Roma Olimpic players
Living people